Fútbol Club Palafrugell is a football team based in Palafrugell, Girona, Spain. Founded in 1920, it plays in Segona Catalana.
Its stadium is Josep Pla i Arbonès, with a capacity of 4,000.

History
In 1910, Ateneu Palafrugellenc was founded. It was a multisport club chaired by Josep Barceló i Matas and was best known for its football. The club was disbanded in 1919.
In 1920 Fútbol Club Palafrugell was founded. Their best years came in the 2000s when they played six seasons in the Tercera División.
Alfredo Di Stefano played his first match in Spain with FC Palafrugell in a pre-season match against FC Barcelona amateur on 19 July 1953.

Season to season 

12 seasons in Tercera División

Notable players
 Narcís Martí Filosia

References

External links 
 Official website

Football clubs in Catalonia
Association football clubs established in 1920
1920 establishments in Spain